Qarah Tegini (also Romanized as Qarah Tegīnī and Qareh Tegīnī; also known as Qarā Tegīneh, Qarātgīni, Qarā Tīgenī, and Qaratīni) is a village in Kuh Sardeh Rural District, in the Central District of Malayer County, Hamadan Province, Iran. At the 2006 census, its population was 263, in 75 families.

References 

Populated places in Malayer County